Pyrausta marginepunctalis is a moth in the family Crambidae. It was described by Max Gaede in 1916. It is found in Cameroon.

References

Endemic fauna of Cameroon
Moths described in 1916
marginepunctalis
Moths of Africa